Lee Burridge (born November 1968) is a British DJ and producer who helped launch the underground club scene in Hong Kong during the early 1990s. He currently plays at nightclubs across the world. Renowned for his storytelling musical style in his DJ sets as well as for his energy and enthusiasm in the DJ booth, his style encompasses the deeper and groovier end of house and techno. Equally suited to night time as they are for sunrise or sunset events.  Burridge was a member of England's Tyrant Soundsystem (along with DJs Craig Richards and Sasha) and has mixed albums for labels such as Balance, Fabric, Global Underground and Hooj Choons.

Biography

Early career (1985 to 1990) 
Lee Burridge's DJ career began in the tiny tourist village of Eype in the county of Dorset on 26 December 1983. He played for the first time at The New Inn, a bar owned and run by his parents at the time. Shortly thereafter, with the help of his father, Burridge started his own mobile DJ operation, "Cutz" and spent the next few years travelling the surrounding countryside villages and towns playing weddings, birthday parties and even the occasional funeral. Working as a mobile DJ led to a seasonal opportunity at a local holiday resort. Soon after that, Burridge began performing every weekend at the local town's nightclub where he played mostly chart music while also entertaining the crowd with his antics behind the decks as well as on the microphone.

Burridge's first true big break came when he landed a residency at an award-winning club called The Palace in Somerset. He played weekly and was introduced to the art of mixing records by one of the club's other resident DJs, Wayne Rideout. It was also at The Palace during the summer of 1987 that a group of visitors turned Burridge on to London's emerging acid house sound which would shape his career and define a path to this day.

Hong Kong (1991 to 1997)
In early 1991, Burridge was spotted and headhunted by a club owner from overseas who offered him a job abroad in the then British colony of Hong Kong.

Moving on his 22nd birthday, Burridge moved to Hong Kong starting his full-time DJ career for the first time at a club called Joe Bananas. He initially played to a mostly mainstream audience at his first Hong Kong job, where he earned a reputation for being a party DJ, hanging upside down from the sprinkler system on the ceiling above the booth and mixing top 40 music to a more commercial crowd. After 4:00 am though the crowd changed and drew local bar employees. Burridge played more underground house music which led to him forging a friendship with two managers of another local bar named The Beach Hut. All had attended some of the UK's early rave parties and decided to bring their experiences to Hong Kong. Aimed initially at the Western crowd the tiny venue hosted the first electronic music event in 1992 which thereafter led to a thriving dance music scene. The first event drew approximately one hundred people but by the second event a month later five hundred people turned up attempting to get into the bar causing a roadblock outside that the police had to disperse.

The scene grew rapidly as other promoters popped up but it was the mainstay nightly venues that really cemented this period of Hong Kong's dance music history as unique and exciting. After finishing work at 5:00 am in Joe Banana's Burridge had discovered an empty basement bar with great sound directly across the street. The Big Apple slowly became the place to be as seven nights a week Burridge would be found playing into the mid morning or later. Burridge created and held two different club residencies in the once-seedy Wan Chai District between 1992–1997 which were The Big Apple and Neptunes. Playing an eclectic mix of dance music six or seven nights a week to packed dance floors these parties were the most popular nights in Hong Kong club scene helping establish Burridge's early DJ career and gaining attention from visiting artists and promoters.

One of Burridge's arguably biggest Hong Kong achievements, which he rarely mentions, was the establishment of Neptune's. Burridge and his friends at the time had left for Hadrin in Thailand during Christmas of 1996. Being people of leisure, thought nothing about whether their regular gigs would be available when they got back to Hong Kong, if they decided a few more weeks in Thailand was a good idea, which they ultimately ended up doing. Also during his Hong Kong stint, Burridge discovered Haad Rin, Thailand, and was a key player in bringing electronic music and DJing to the island. Arriving in February 1992 after hearing about the location from a group of travellers who passed through Hong Kong, Burridge's performances helped grow the full moon parties from drum circles around open fires on the beach into what can be considered the Mecca of Full Moon parties. Burridge would continue to visit the island regularly until 1999, staying for three months at a time to play full moon as well as weekly parties held at the Backyard venue alongside local DJ A and another Haad Rin mainstay, Backyard Dave who was also institutional in bringing dance music to the island.

In his final few years in Hong Kong he often invited visiting DJs to play at either the Big Apple or Neptune's and it was after one of these weekends that he began his friendship with UK DJs Sasha and Craig Richards, who ended up inviting him to form the Tyrant Sound System upon his return to the UK.[1]

Return to England and Tyrant (1998 to 2001)
Although Burridge's reputation in Hong Kong earned him gigs nearly every night in the city's top venues, he was completely unknown in the UK.
Richards—who was running several successful club nights in London at the time, including Georgie and Malibu Stacey—invited Burridge to play at several of his parties. Traction was slow and after one year back in the UK Lee considered returning to Asia. It was shortly after this that Tyrant was formed and the subsequent launch catapulted Burridge's career in the UK. 
As part of Tyrant, Burridge teamed up with Richards and Sasha to play regular monthly nights in London, first in a warehouse space In Park Royal, which then moved to the End nightclub. Adding a monthly night at The Bomb in Nottingham, the brand garnered a great deal of interest and press allowing Burridge to begin playing more solo gigs at leading British nightclubs, such as Cream, Golden, and Ministry of Sound. He mixed his first compilation for Hooj Choons, Deeper Shades of Hooj 2 in just a single night.

In 1999, Burridge cracked DJ Magazines prestigious annual Top 100 list for the first time, placing 33rd. That same year, Burridge also released his first solo mix album, Metropolis on Tide.

While continuing to carve out a career of his own, Burridge's work with the Tyrant project blossomed. Sasha's production schedule caused him to miss several key shows allowing Burridge and Richards to forge forward. Picking up the slack they continued to evolve the Tyrant nights picking up new fans as they went. When Sasha eventually decided to leave the project, the duo solidified a new sound for the project leaning away from Sasha's more progressive vibes. This sound led the way for many artists and inspired many who followed their legendary nights. It was the release of their highly acclaimed Tyrant mix compilation in 2000 that opened the door to their global recognition. Around that same time, Burridge and Richards began a monthly Tyrant residency at the newly opened Fabric Nightclub in London, which they held down monthly until 2006.

Early 2000s (2002 to 2004)
In 2001, Burridge appeared on the cover of DJ Magazine and was asked to join an emerging group of young DJs for Global Underground's NuBreed series. Burridge's double-disc NuBreed compilation, which featured a mixture of breakbeat, tech house and techno, again helping to cement the DJ's mass appeal and popularity. That same year he also moved into the top 30 DJs in the world in the DJ Magazine poll. In 2002, Burridge and Richards teamed up once again for another Tyrant mix CD. No Shoes, No Cake also featured Burridge's first single release, Lost and Found, on Fire recordings. The duo's monthly parties in London at Fabric had become one of the most popular nights in the city helping Burridge rise to the 9th most popular DJ in the world in the DJ Magazine poll. Burridge was regularly touring globally at this time playing cities such as Sydney, Buenos Aires, New York, Singapore and Ibiza in addition to playing festivals such as Creamfields, the Gatecrasher Summer Sound System, V Festival and Homelands. In 2003, Global Underground approached him once again to mix the second installment of the label's 24:7 series. The two-disc release was conceptually themed as a day and a night disc foreshadowing his interest in the daytime sound he later began exploring.
  
His appeal in the US really began through regular gigs in New York. Working alongside Made Events, Burridge played at the legendary clubs, Twilo and Vinyl as well as an annual series of Halloween events. Winter Music Conference in Miami also gave exposure to his long sets and passion for after parties.

(2005 to 2010)
In early 2005, Burridge and Richards were invited by James Lavelle to remix the single "Eye for an Eye" by his U.N.K.L.E. project. Later that year Burridge departed from London after nearly a decade and began an ambitious new project called 365. Following many years of global touring and one-off shows, Burridge developed the 365 project as a residency-based tour where he would move to a city for a month or two at a time to play a series of parties allowing him time to learn both more about the city and its clubbing crowd. Beginning in New York, Burridge spent the next two years taking the 365 concept to Ibiza, Florence, Buenos Aires, Sydney, New York, San Francisco, Denver and Hong Kong. In each city, he worked with local promoters to build a series of four or more parties while also setting aside time to work with local producers. During the 365 project, Burridge kept a popular journal which was published online monthly by DJ Magazine describing the adventures he encountered and the humorous take he has on life on the road as a DJ. That year Burridge also joined Sander Kleinenberg to mix one half of This Is Everybody! On Tour, a more fan-friendly album than his previous endeavours[4] and he began what would become an annual mainstay party at the Winter Music Conference in Miami, Florida, in conjunction with Made Events, the Burridge Barrage. In 2006, Burridge began another annual party at San Francisco's Love Parade called the LoveLee Party. He launched his own record label, Almost Anonymous, to release the music he produced with local artists he collaborated with during the 365 project.[5] The label released collaborations between Burridge and Andy Page, Steve Porter and Dan F, the latter of which, Treat 'Em Mean, Keep 'Em Keen, appeared on Ewan Pearson's Fabric 35 album. However, the label suffered the same fate as many others in 2007, going under when its distributor went into receivership.
 
Burridge began visiting the Burning Man festival for the first time in 2004, and would go on to describe the annual eight-day arts and musical gathering in Nevada as the best event he had been to.[5]

2007 saw Burridge mix Balance: 012. The twelfth installment of the Balance series for Australia's EQ Recordings, joining DJs such as James Holden, Chris Fortier and Desyn Masiello. The three-disc album, which received critical acclaim across the board, was nominated for "Compilation of the Year" at the PLUG Awards. It also featured artwork and packaging that Burridge helped design.

All Day I Dream (ADID) & Burning Man Festival 
In 2011, Burridge launched a new project encompassing both a daytime event and record label. Titled, 'All Day I Dream', Burridge continued investigating his new musical direction that leaned towards the more melodic and melancholic sounds of house and techno which have since grown enormously in popularity. The (re)exploration of a more melodic sound was actually first cited in his 'all day i dream' podcast for Resident Advisor in 2008. These monthly summertime events began on a New York rooftop (office op's) in Williamsburg in June 2011. By the end of 2012's season, their ever-growing popularity led to the event being moved to a much larger space (The Well) in Bushwick. Hosted on Sunday afternoons from 3:00 pm until just after sunset each unique event has been produced paying close attention to the sound and a more organic production aesthetic including floating materials above people's heads, bamboo structures, fresh flowers and many other loving details that help create a much warmer and more organic feeling environment that complements the feeling of the music. All Day I Dream's popularity continues to grow across the world and, as well as hosting major festival stages such as Picnik Electronic and BPM in Mexico where ADID hosted their own stage from 2012 on, the event took up a second USA summer residency, opening in June 2012, in Los Angeles which joined New York as host city to the ADID summer season which runs over four months each summer. The melodic sound pushed by the event and Burridge has been supported strongly by releases on his All Day I Dream label. Matthew Dekay's productions alongside Burridge have created many magical moments both on the label as well as at the events. Dekay and Burridge first crossed paths at a party in New York in 2009 where the two instantly hit it off and began working together. First collaborating on the track 'Wongle' their friendship began to grow during this time. Burridge's plan for the ADID event was complemented by Dekay's studio brilliance creating the early music of the soon-to-be label and parties. The pair released Gemini spell, Holding On and Fur Die Liebe on ADID as well as 'Lost in a Moment' on Innervisions creating a definitive and unique sound for the time. Strong yet subtle grooves underpin orchestrated elements that delve into minor-key harmonies with complex arrangements became the soundtrack to many people's musical experiences both at All Day I Dream as well as Burning Man festival. Burridge's popularity has grown exponentially once again in recent years. Both through the ADID brand as well as his affiliation to the Burning Man festival. Burridge's seven to ten-hour DJ sets each closing Sunday (which the past few years have taken place at Pink Mammoth) still remain one of the playa's best kept little secrets.

All Day I Dream took the lead in 2011 and continues to inspire many to follow in its footsteps. The event and label continue to grow and support and nurture emerging artists such as Yokoo, Lost Desert, Bedouin, Oona Dahl, Gorje Hewek & Izhevski, Powel, Hoj and many more.

Burridge continued to release new music in 2016 and 2017 after discovering Lost Desert. Collaborating, the pair have released their more nighttime club focussed tracks on Get Weird while their releases on All Day I Dream perpetuate and epitomise the label's pursuit of the dreamier and melodic side of the dance music spectrum.  Working alongside Congo-born singer Junior Akwerty, "Lingala" was released in Summer 2017. A firm favourite at the events, the track picked up traction with DJs across the board gaining popularity in the clubs as well as on the radio. Remixed by Gorje Hewek & Izhevski, the track has been streamed millions of times on Spotify and continues to garner love and attention from those who discover it. It was featured in the Netflix show "White Lines" in 2020. Junior Akwerty toured with Burridge and Lost Desert across the US to rapturous response. In 2019 the duo released their debut album. Entitled Melt it continued to explore beauty, melancholy, depth and love across its ten tracks. Whether it was on the dance floor or on the beaches and in the restaurants of Ibiza and Mykonos the album was a firm favourite with the fans. 

Currently, Burridge lives between London, New York and Los Angeles. He continues to follow his bliss, playing his own events as well as clubs and festivals across the globe. He is managed by Jazz Spinder from FM Artists and booked by Matthew Kingsley and Alex Becket at CAA in Los Angeles and Maria May at CAA UK.

Awards and honours
DJ Magazine Top 100 Poll Rankings
1999 	33
2000 	45
2001 	29
2002 	9
2003 	30
2004 	56
2005 	76
2006 	88
2007 	85

"Compilation of the Year" nomination at the PLUG Awards.

Selected discography
DJ mixes/compilations:
1998: 	Deeper Shades of Hooj: Volume Two (Hooj Choons)
1999:	Metropolis (Tide)
2000: 	Tyrant with Craig Richards (Distinct'ive Breaks Records)
2001: 	Global Underground: Nubreed 005 (Boxed)
2002:	No Shoes, No Cake with Craig Richards (Fabric, London)
2003:	24:7 (Boxed)
2005:	This Is Everybody! On Tour (Ultra Records)
2007:	Balance 012 (EQ Recordings)

Releases:
2001:	Lost & Found EP (Fire)
2006:	Treat 'Em Mean, Keep 'Em Keen (Almost Anonymous)
2007:	Do You Smoke Pot? (Almost Anonymous)
2007:	Raw Dog (Almost Anonymous)
2010:   Wongel (Cecille)
2011:   Here's Johnny (Leftroom)
2011:   Groove me (Pooled music)
2012:   Lost in a moment (Innervisions)
2012:   Tubby (Get Weird)
2012:   Gemini Spell (All Day I Dream)
2012:   Fur Die Liebe (All Day I Dream)
2013:   Holding on (All Day I Dream)
2016:   Stand up right (Get Weird)
2016:   Lingala EP (All Day I Dream)
2017:   Loopyness EP (All Day I Dream)
2017:   Absent without thoughts (All Day I Dream)
2017:   K Bug EP (Get Weird)
2018:   Elongi EP (All Day I Dream)
2019:   Melt (All Day I Dream)

References

External links
 Lee Burridge on Myspace
 
 
 (2006) Lee Burridge Interview
 Lee Burridge tracklisting archive

Video
 Lee Burridge @ Kudos Beach Romania
 Leeki Tikki Boat with Lee Burridge, Winter Music Conference 2009
 Lee Burridge rocks Movement 2008

British DJs
1968 births
Living people